Geneva Creek is a short tributary of the North Fork South Platte River, approximately  long, in central Colorado in the United States. It drains part of the Rocky Mountains southwest of Denver in northern Park County. It rises at the continental divide west of Mount Bierstadt and descends through a canyon to the southeast. It joins the North Fork South Platte from the north at Grant along U.S. Highway 285. The valley of the river provides the route of the Guanella Pass Scenic Byway between Georgetown and Grant.

The upper part of Geneva Creek is an iron fen, where iron oxide is deposited by mineral-rich groundwater coming to the surface. The area is within the Colorado Mineral Belt, and gold and silver deposits were mined nearby at the now-deserted town of Geneva. Natural springs add high dissolved concentrations of copper and zinc to the stream.

See also
List of rivers of Colorado

References

External links
 Clear Creek County Open Space, Geneva Creek Iron Fen.
 Colorado State Parks, Geneva Basin Iron Fens

Rivers of Colorado
Rivers of Park County, Colorado
Rivers of Clear Creek County, Colorado
Tributaries of the Platte River